Katherine "Kate" Bailey (born 13  February 1982 in Sydney, New South Wales) is a Paralympic swimming competitor from Australia.

She competed in seven events and won two bronze medals at the 2000 Sydney Games in the women's 100 m butterfly S9 and women's 4 × 100 m medley 34 pts events. At the 2004 Athens Games, she competed in four events and repeated her medal results from Sydney winning two bronze medals at the 2000 Sydney Games in the women's 100 m butterfly S9 and women's 4 × 100 m medley 34 pts events
She competed at the 2002 Commonwealth Games in Manchester, England in elite athlete with a disability swimming events.  At the 2002 IPC Swimming World Championships in Mar Del Plata, Argentina she won three gold medals and one silver medal.

She was coached by Graeme 'Grub' Carroll at the Warringah Aquatic Swim Club. From 2002 to 2004 she was an Australian Institute of Sport paralympic swimming scholarship holder.  Also she was a New South Wales Institute of Sport scholarship holder.

References

External links

Female Paralympic swimmers of Australia
Swimmers at the 2000 Summer Paralympics
Swimmers at the 2004 Summer Paralympics
Paralympic bronze medalists for Australia
1982 births
Australian Institute of Sport Paralympic swimmers
Living people
New South Wales Institute of Sport alumni
Medalists at the 2000 Summer Paralympics
Medalists at the 2004 Summer Paralympics
Paralympic medalists in swimming
Australian female medley swimmers
Australian female butterfly swimmers
S9-classified Paralympic swimmers
Swimmers from Sydney
21st-century Australian women